Nolinsky (masculine), Nolinskaya (feminine), or Nolinskoye (neuter) may refer to:
Nolinsky District, a district of Kirov Oblast, Russia
Nolinsky Uyezd (1780–1929), an administrative division (an uyezd) of Vyatka Viceroyalty and Vyatka Governorate of the Russian Empire and the early Russian SFSR
Nolinskoye Urban Settlement, a municipal formation which the Town of Nolinsk in Nolinsky District of Kirov Oblast, Russia is incorporated as